Oh Baby! is an album by American organist Big John Patton recorded in 1965 and released on the Blue Note label.

Reception

The AllMusic review by Michael Erlewine awarded the album 4 stars and stated "Although a little on the light side, thanks to Patton and Green, the groove does go down".

Track listing
All compositions by John Patton except where noted
 "Fat Judy" (Ben Dixon) – 7:40
 "Oh Baby" – 6:17
 "Each Time" – 5:39
 "One to Twelve" – 7:52
 "Night Flight" (Harold Vick) – 6:35
 "Good Juice" – 6:31

Personnel
Big John Patton – organ
Blue Mitchell – trumpet
Harold Vick – tenor saxophone
Grant Green – guitar
Ben Dixon – drums

References

Blue Note Records albums
John Patton (musician) albums
1965 albums
Albums recorded at Van Gelder Studio
Albums produced by Alfred Lion